Julie Foy (born 5 May 1971) is an English actress and producer, best known for The Silent Child which received critical acclaim and won the Academy Award for Best Live Action Short Film.

Julie Foy attended Canon Slade School in Bolton then trained at the College of the Performing Arts in Salford. Whilst still at school she made her television debut in Jossy's Giants before going on to appear in Press Gang and on stage in Our Day Out.

She appeared in the Granada Television series How To Be Cool and made appearances in Dramarama and Forever Young. In 1988 she played Sally Seddon's sister Gina Seddon in Coronation Street for a year before taking the role of a nurse in the 1989 movie Strapless.

Foy then appeared in BBC's Casualty and onstage at The Birmingham Repertory Company as Ruby in When We Are Married. She later played Jo in A Taste of Honey at the York Theatre Royal. Other television work includes Dawn and the Candidate and as Madge in Missing Persons. In 1996 she returned to the Birmingham Rep to play Marigold in Toad of Toad Hall.

Filmography

Awards and nominations
The Silent Child won best short film at the Rhode Island International Film Festival in August 2017. This made it eligible for entry to the Oscars. In December 2017 the film was selected as one of the final ten films in the Live Action Short Film category for the 90th Academy Awards. On 23 January 2018, it was announced that The Silent Child was nominated for the Academy Award for Best Live Action Short Film for the 90th Academy Awards, which it then won.

References

English filmmakers
Living people
1970 births
Actors from Bolton
English film producers
English film actresses
English television actresses
English soap opera actresses
Producers who won the Live Action Short Film Academy Award
People from Bolton